Tom McCauley (born May 3, 1947) is a former defensive back in the National Football League. He was drafted in the tenth round of the 1969 NFL Draft by the Minnesota Vikings and would play three seasons with the Atlanta Falcons.

References

Players of American football from Worcester, Massachusetts
Atlanta Falcons players
American football defensive backs
Wisconsin Badgers football players
North Carolina Tar Heels football players
1947 births
Living people